Lucas Donat (born 1962) is an advertising executive, former actor, and the Chief Brand Officer of TrueCar, a publicly traded company headquartered in Santa Monica, California.

Early life 
Born to actors Michael Learned and Peter Donat in Toronto, Canada, Donat is one of three children. He played the role of Mark Thorn in the 1978 horror movie Damien: Omen II.

Career 
Donat is considered one of the foremost innovators of advertising and brand building for internet-based companies. As co-founding CEO of Donat/Wald Advertising with his partner Traci Wald in 1987, Lucas has led the advertising and branding efforts for many early stage Internet companies that have gone on to become leaders in their respective categories: eHarmony, LegalZoom, and Hotwire.

In 2014, Donat/Wald changed its name to Tiny Rebellion and took home the distinction of Advertising Age's Small Advertising Agency of the Year for shops under 75 employees. After over 20 years of service to the agency as its CEO and creative head, Donat and Wald sold their shares to a partner that joined them later, but still retain the rights to the Tiny Rebellion name and all of its historical creative assets. Donat has since held the positions of chief marketing officer and chief brand officer of TrueCar.

References

External links 
 
 Lucas Donat on lucasdonat.com

1962 births
Living people
Male actors from Toronto